The Grobin Davis Mound Group  is a prehistoric Caddoan site located in McCurtain County in Southeastern Oklahoma.  It was listed on the National Register of Historic Places in 1984.

It is a relatively large Caddoan ceremonial center. It is located on a terrace above the confluence of Little River and White Oak Creek, and includes seven mounds and a central plaza in an approximately  area.

References

Further reading
 Robert E. Bell, ed., Prehistory of Oklahoma (Orlando, Fla.: Academic Press, 1984).
 Claudette Marie Gilbert and Robert Brooks, From Mounds to Mammoths: A Field Guide to Oklahoma Prehistory (Norman: University of Oklahoma Press, 2000).

External links
 Encyclopedia of Oklahoma History and Culture - Grobin Davis Site

Archaeological sites on the National Register of Historic Places in Oklahoma
Geography of McCurtain County, Oklahoma
National Register of Historic Places in McCurtain County, Oklahoma